The 1983–84 World Series was a One Day International (ODI) cricket tri-series where Australia played host to Pakistan and West Indies. Australia and West Indies reached the Finals, which West Indies won 2–0.

Points Table

Result summary

Final series
West Indies won the best of three final series against Australia 2–0.

References

1983 in Australian cricket
1983 in Pakistani cricket
1983–84 Australian cricket season
1984 in Australian cricket
1984 in Pakistani cricket
1983
International cricket competitions from 1980–81 to 1985
1983–84